Prunum camachoi is a species of sea snail, a marine gastropod mollusk in the family Marginellidae, the margin snails.

Description

Distribution
This species is distributed in the Gulf of Mexico

References

 Rosenberg, G., F. Moretzsohn, and E. F. García. 2009. Gastropoda (Mollusca) of the Gulf of Mexico, Pp. 579–699 in Felder, D.L. and D.K. Camp (eds.), Gulf of Mexico–Origins, Waters, and Biota. Biodiversity. Texas A&M Press, College Station, Texas.

Marginellidae
Gastropods described in 2003